The Sala Stadium is a sports stadium in Ashkelon, Israel. The stadium has a 5,250 capacity, and is the home ground of Hapoel Ashkelon.

On 29 December 2008, shortly before a training session, the stadium was hit by a Grad rocket fired from the Gaza Strip. The rocket landed in the penalty area.

References

 

Sports venues in Ashkelon
Hapoel Ashkelon F.C.
Football venues in Israel